Superunknown is the fourth studio album by American rock band Soundgarden, released on March 8, 1994, through A&M Records. It is the band's second album with bassist Ben Shepherd, and features new producer Michael Beinhorn. Soundgarden began work on the album after touring in support of its previous album, Badmotorfinger (1991). Superunknown captured the heaviness of the band's earlier releases while displaying a more diverse range of influences.

Superunknown was a critical and commercial success and became the band's breakthrough album. It debuted at number one on the Billboard 200, selling 310,000 copies in its opening week. The album also topped the Australian, Canadian, and New Zealand charts. Five singles were released from the album: "The Day I Tried to Live", "My Wave", "Fell on Black Days", "Spoonman", and "Black Hole Sun", the latter two of which won Grammy Awards and helped Soundgarden reach mainstream popularity. In 1995, the album was nominated for the Grammy Award for Best Rock Album. The album has been certified six times platinum by the RIAA in the United States. Superunknown has been listed by several publications as one of the best albums of the 1990s and a quintessential grunge album. In April 2019, it was ranked No. 9 on Rolling Stones "50 Greatest Grunge Albums" list.

Recording
Soundgarden began work on the album about two months after finishing its stint on the 1992 Lollapalooza tour. The individual band members would work on material on their own and then bring in demos to which the other members of the band would contribute. Frontman Chris Cornell said that the band members allowed each other more freedom than on past records. Thayil observed that even though the band spent as much time writing and arranging as it had on previous albums, it spent a lot more time working on recording the songs. After two albums with producer Terry Date, the band decided to seek another collaborator, as guitarist Kim Thayil said, "We just thought we'd go for a change." Eventually they settled on producer Michael Beinhorn, who "didn't have his own trademark sound which he was trying to tack on to Soundgarden" and had ideas the band approved.

The album's recording sessions took place from July 1993 to September 1993 at Bad Animals Studio in Seattle, Washington, as according to Cornell "there was never a decent studio in Seattle and now there's one with a Neve console, so it seemed obvious to use it". Bad Animals' resident engineer Adam Kasper, who went on to produce Soundgarden's following albums, assisted Beinhorn on the recording process. Soundgarden took the approach of recording one song at a time. The drum and bass parts were recorded first for each song, and then Cornell and Thayil would lay down their parts over top. Cornell said that getting to know Beinhorn contributed to the length of time Soundgarden spent working on the album. The band spent time experimenting with different drum and guitar sounds, as well as utilizing techniques such as layering, resulting in an expansive production sound. Cornell said, "Michael Beinhorn was so into sounds. He was so, almost, anal about it, that it took the piss out of us a lot of the time ... By the time you get the sounds that you want to record the song, you're sick and tired of playing it." Beinhorn tried to add many of his preferred musicians to mold the band's sound, in what Billboard described as "weaning the band from brute force, giving it the impetus to invest in a more subtle power". For instance, prior to recording the vocals of "Black Hole Sun", Beinhorn made Cornell listen to Frank Sinatra.

Superunknown lasts for 15 songs clocking on approximately 70 minutes because according to Cornell, "we didn't really want to argue over what should be cut". Soundgarden took a break in the middle of recording to open for Neil Young on a ten-day tour of the United States. The band then brought in Brendan O'Brien to mix the album, as Beinhorn felt the band needed "a fresh pair of ears"; O'Brien had come recommended by Pearl Jam guitarist Stone Gossard. Thayil called the mixing process "very painless", and bassist Ben Shepherd said it was "the fastest part of the record".

Composition
The songs on Superunknown captured the metal influences of the band's previous works while showcasing the group's newly evolving style. Steve Huey of AllMusic said that the band's "earlier punk influences are rarely detectable, replaced by surprisingly effective appropriations of pop and psychedelia." Cornell labeled the album as more "challenging" and "versatile" than the band's previous releases. The songs on the album are more experimental and diverse than the band's previous recordings, with some songs having a Middle-Eastern or Indian flavor (for example "Half", sung by Shepherd). Some songs also show a Beatles influence, such as "Head Down" and "Black Hole Sun". In a 1994 interview with Guitar World, Thayil explained, "We looked deep down inside the very core of our souls and there was a little Ringo sitting there. Oh sure, we like telling people it's John Lennon or George Harrison; but when you really look deep inside of Soundgarden, there's a little Ringo wanting to get out." Drummer Matt Cameron said that the experimentation on the album was "just a matter of refinement." According to The A.V. Club, the album "both redefined and transcended grunge". Michael Beinhorn stated that to achieve the intensity of Superunknown, he sought influence from European electronic music, such as the British Aphex Twin and the Dutch genre of Gabber, described by him as "some of the rawest music made".

Soundgarden used alternate tunings and odd time signatures on several of the album's songs. "Spoonman", "Black Hole Sun", "Let Me Drown" and "Kickstand" were performed in drop D tuning while "Mailman" and "Limo Wreck" employed CGDGBe tuning. Some songs used more unorthodox tunings: "My Wave" and "The Day I Tried to Live" are both in an EEBBBb tuning. "Head Down" and "Half" both utilised CGCGGe tuning. "4th of July" is in a similar CFCGBe tuning. "Fresh Tendrils" is in DGDGBe tuning and "Like Suicide" is performed in DGDGBC tuning. Soundgarden's use of odd time signatures was varied as well; "Fell On Black Days" is in 6/4, "Limo Wreck" is played in 15/8, "My Wave" alternates between 5/4 and 4/4, and "The Day I Tried to Live" alternates between 7/8 and 4/4 sections. Thayil has said that Soundgarden usually did not consider the time signature of a song until after the band had written it, and said that the use of odd meters was "a total accident".

Lyrically, the album is quite dark and mysterious, as much of it is often interpreted to be dealing with issues such as substance abuse, suicide, and depression, with running themes of revenge, annihilation, seclusion, fear, loss, death, and discovery. Cornell was inspired by the writings of Sylvia Plath at the time. Commenting on the album's lyrics, Thayil said that "a lot of Superunknown seems to me to be about life, not death. Maybe not affirming it, but rejoicing—like the Druids [put it]: 'Life is good, but death's gonna be even better!" Cameron said that the lyrics on the album are "a big fuck-you to the world, a plea to 'leave us alone. Cornell stated that "Let Me Drown" is about "crawling back to the womb to die", "Fell on Black Days" is about realizing "you're unhappy in the extreme", "Black Hole Sun" is about a "surreal dreamscape", "Limo Wreck" is a "'shame-on-decadence' song", "The Day I Tried to Live" is about "trying to step out of being patterned and closed off and reclusive", and "4th of July" is about using LSD. Cornell talked about "Mailman" at a concert saying, "This next one is about killing your boss. It's about coming to work early one morning cause you have a special agenda and you're going to shoot him in the fucking head." Conversely, "Like Suicide" was literal, written by Cornell after a bird flew into a window of his house. He found the severely injured animal and killed it, hitting it with a brick to end its suffering.

The video clip of the song "Spoonman" is notable for featuring a performance by Artis the Spoonman, a street entertainer in Seattle. The title of the song is credited to bassist Jeff Ament of Pearl Jam. While on the set of the movie Singles, Ament produced a list of song titles for the fictional band featured in the movie. Cornell took it as a challenge to write songs for the film using those titles, and "Spoonman" was one of them. An acoustic demo version of the song appears in the movie. Cornell said that the song is about "the paradox of who [Artis] is and what people perceive him as".

Packaging
The album's cover art (known as the 'Screaming Elf') is a distorted photograph of the band members, photographed by Kevin Westenberg, above a black and white upside-down burning forest. Concerning the artwork, Cornell said, "Superunknown relates to birth in a way ... Being born or even dying—getting flushed into something that you know nothing about. The hardest thing is to nail down a visual image to put on a title like that. The first thing we thought of was a forest in grey or black. Soundgarden has always been associated with images of flowers and lush colors and this was the opposite. It still seemed organic but it was very dark and cold ... I was into those stories as a kid where forests were full of evil and scary things as opposed to being happy gardens that you go camping in." In a 1994 Pulse! magazine interview, Cornell said that the inspiration for the album's title came from his misreading of a video entitled Superclown. He added, "I thought it was a cool title. I'd never heard it before, never saw it before, and it inspired me." The album also saw a limited release on 12" colored vinyl (blue, orange, and clear), as a double-LP in a gatefold sleeve. The album's title 'SUPERUNKNOWN' is sometimes displayed with the "UNKNOWN" as semi upside down and reversed lettering (stylized as "SUPER∩ИKИOMИ").

On May 25, 2017, photographer Kevin Westenberg revealed the full photo from the cover for the first time on his Instagram account.

Release and commercial performance
Superunknown was Soundgarden's breakout album, earning the band international recognition. Upon its release in March 1994, Superunknown debuted at number one on the Billboard 200 album chart, and eventually closed the year as the 13th best-selling album of 1994, with 2.5 million copies sold. The album has been certified six times platinum by the RIAA in the United States, three times platinum in Canada and Australia, two times platinum in Sweden, platinum in the United Kingdom, and gold in the Netherlands and Italy.

As of 2019 Superunknown has sold 3.9 million copies in United States according to Nielsen. The album spawned the EP Songs from the Superunknown and the CD-ROM Alive in the Superunknown, both released in 1995.

20th-anniversary reissues
The 20th-anniversary reissue of "Superunknown" was made available in two deluxe versions. The Deluxe Edition was a 2-CD package featuring the remastered album along with disc two consisting of demos, rehearsals, B-sides and more. The Super Deluxe Edition was a 5-CD package featuring the remastered album, additional demos, rehearsals and B-sides and the fifth disc is the album mixed in Blu-ray Audio 5.1 Surround Sound. The Super Deluxe Edition was packaged in a hardbound book with a lenticular cover, liner notes by David Fricke and newly reimagined album artwork designed by Josh Graham. It also featured never-before-seen band photography by Kevin Westerberg. A 2-LP gatefold of the original 16 vinyl tracks remastered on 200-gram vinyl in a gatefold jacket was also made available. In addition, the Superunknown singles and associated b-sides with newly interpreted artwork sleeves by Josh Graham was reissued on Record Store Day, April 19, 2014, as a set of five limited-edition 10-inch vinyl records."

Critical reception

Superunknown received universal acclaim from music critics. Q said, "Soundgarden dealt in unreconstructed heavy rock: a heavy guitar sound, depth-charge drumming ... Yet Superunknown also includes more measured moments". Rolling Stone magazine's J. D. Considine was impressed by the record's range and, despite criticizing "Black Hole Sun" and "Half", he said "at its best, Superunknown offers a more harrowing depiction of alienation and despair than anything on In Utero". Jon Pareles of The New York Times credited the band with trying to transcend conventional heavy metal: "Superunknown actually tries to broaden its audience by breaking heavy-metal genre barriers that Soundgarden used to accept." In Entertainment Weekly, David Browne wrote, "Soundgarden is pumped and primed on Superunknown, and they deliver the goods." He praised it as a "hard-rock milestone – a boiling vat of volcanic power, record-making smarts, and '90s anomie and anxiety that sets a new standard for anything called metal." Ann Powers from Blender said that "guitarist Thayil helps create the stoner-rock template", and that it "stands as Soundgarden's masterpiece". Village Voice critic Robert Christgau, who had "mocked" Soundgarden's "conceptual pretentions for years", still felt their foredooming, pessimistic lyrics lacked much substance, but said they had improved composing, arranging, and producing on an album that was "easily the best—most galvanizing, kinetic, sensational, catchy—Zep rip in history". In a retrospective review, AllMusic editor Steve Huey wrote, "It's obvious that Superunknown was consciously styled as a masterwork, and it fulfills every ambition." It received a nomination in the Best Rock Album category for the 1995 Grammy Awards.

"We were listening to Nirvana and Pearl Jam just like everybody else," remarked Def Leppard's Vivian Campbell, "and especially to Soundgarden – the Superunknown record. That was the record that we referenced in terms of the sonics and the mood of it when making Slang."

Accolades
The critical acclaim garnered by Superunknown has led to its inclusion in many lists of the greatest albums.

Tour
The band began touring in January 1994 in Oceania and Japan, areas where the record came out early. The band had never toured these regions before. This round of touring ended in February 1994, and then in March 1994 the band moved on to Europe. The band was to join a 20-date co-headline American tour with Nine Inch Nails in April/May, but had to cancel, but continued with a headlining theater tour on May 27, 1994. The opening acts were Tad and Eleven. In late 1994, after touring in support of Superunknown, doctors discovered that Cornell had severely strained his vocal cords. Soundgarden cancelled several more shows to avoid causing any permanent damage. Cornell said, "I think we kinda overdid it! We were playing five or six nights a week and my voice pretty much took a beating. Towards the end of the American tour I felt like I could still kinda sing, but I wasn't really giving the band a fair shake. You don't buy a ticket to see some guy croak for two hours! That seemed like kind of a rip off." The band made up the dates later in 1995.

Track listing

Outtakes
Although the album's singles featured quite a few B-sides, only "Exit Stonehenge" (from the "Spoonman" single) was sourced from the Superunknown recording sessions in 1993. "Cold Bitch" (also from "Spoonman") was recorded during the Badmotorfinger recording sessions in 1991, "Kyle Petty, Son of Richard" and "Motorcycle Loop" (both from the "Fell on Black Days" single) were recorded by Stuart Hallerman at Avast Studios in Seattle in 1994. "Kyle Petty, Son of Richard" was later featured on the 1996 Home Alive compilation. "Tighter & Tighter", "No Attention", and "An Unkind", all of which later appeared on the band's 1996 album, Down on the Upside, were attempted during the Superunknown recording sessions. Cameron said that the band wasn't pleased with the recording of "No Attention" that came out of the sessions. An instrumental entitled "Ruff Riff-Raff" and a light-hearted song called "Bing Bing Goes to Church" were recorded at album rehearsals but were presumably not recorded during the Superunknown recording sessions. Both were released in 2014 on the 20th anniversary Super Deluxe edition.

Personnel

Soundgarden 
 Chris Cornell – lead vocals, backing vocals, rhythm guitar
 Kim Thayil – lead guitar
 Ben Shepherd – bass, drums and percussion (track 6), backing vocals (track 8), lead vocals and guitar (track 14)
 Matt Cameron – drums, percussion, Mellotron (track 4), pots and pans (track 8)

Additional musicians 
 April Acevez – viola (track 14)
 Artis the Spoonman – spoons (track 8)
 Michael Beinhorn – piano (track 1), production
 Fred Chalenor – harmonic guidance (track 9)
 Justine Foy – cello (track 14)
 Gregg Keplinger – drums and percussion (track 6)
 Natasha Shneider – clavinet (track 12)

Production 
 David Collins – mastering
 Jason Corsaro – engineering
 Adam Kasper – assistant engineering
 Kelk – front cover design
 Gregg Keplinger – studio assistance
 Tony Messina – studio assistance
 Brendan O'Brien – mixing
 Reyzart – layout
 Soundgarden – production
 Kevin Westenberg – band photography
 Susan Silver – management

Charts

Weekly charts

Year-end charts

Singles

Certifications

References

1994 albums
A&M Records albums
Albums produced by Michael Beinhorn
Soundgarden albums
Albums produced by Chris Cornell
Albums produced by Matt Cameron